The 2011 Maldives FA Cup was the 24th edition of the Maldives FA Cup.

The cup winner were guaranteed a place in the 2012 AFC Cup.

First round

|-
|colspan="3" style="background-color:#99CCCC"|19 July 2011

|-
|colspan="3" style="background-color:#99CCCC"|20 July 2011

|-
|colspan="3" style="background-color:#99CCCC"|21 July 2011

|-
|colspan="3" style="background-color:#99CCCC"|22 July 2011

|-
|colspan="3" style="background-color:#99CCCC"|23 July 2011

|-
|colspan="3" style="background-color:#99CCCC"|27 July 2011

|}

Second round

|-
|colspan="3" style="background-color:#99CCCC"|28 July 2011

|-
|colspan="3" style="background-color:#99CCCC"|30 July 2011

|}

Quarterfinals
Byes to quarterfinals: Maziya S&RC, New Radiant SC, Club Valencia, VB Sports Club, Victory SC, Club Vyansa
Second round winners: Club Eagles, Club Riverside

|-
|colspan="3" style="background-color:#99CCCC"|29 September 2011

|-
|colspan="3" style="background-color:#99CCCC"|30 September 2011

|-
|colspan="3" style="background-color:#99CCCC"|1 October 2011

|-
|colspan="3" style="background-color:#99CCCC"|2 October 2011

|}

Semifinals

|-
|colspan="3" style="background-color:#99CCCC"|26 October 2011

|-
|colspan="3" style="background-color:#99CCCC"|27 October 2011

|}

Third place match

|-
|colspan="3" style="background-color:#99CCCC"|30 October 2011

|}

Final

|-
|colspan="3" style="background-color:#99CCCC"|31 October 2011

|}

References
FA Cup Draw (2011),  
FA Cup Fixtures (2011)
FA Cup Results (2011)

External links
Football Association of Maldives
2011 FA Cup (Maldives) at RSSSF.com

Maldives FA Cup seasons
FA Cup